Robin Söderling was the defending champion, but withdrew due to illness.
David Ferrer won the title, defeating Nicolás Almagro 6–2, 6–2 in the final.

Seeds
The top four seeds receive a bye into the second round.

Draw

Finals

Top half

Bottom half

Qualifying

Seeds

Qualifiers

Draw

First qualifier

Second qualifier

Third qualifier

Fourth qualifier

External links
 Main `draw
 Qualifying draw

Mens Singles